The Macchi M.9 was a flying boat bomber designed by Alessandro Tonini and produced by Macchi in Italy close to the end of World War I and shortly afterwards.

Design and development
The M.9 was a conventional design for its day, with unstaggered biplane wings of unequal span and a single engine mounted pusher-fashion on struts in the interplane gap, close to the underside of the top wing. The pilot and observer sat side by side in an open cockpit. While earlier Macchi flying boats had conventional interplane struts, the M.9 introduced the Warren truss-style struts that would become characteristic of this manufacturer's designs.

Around 16 examples were delivered to the Italian Navy prior to the Armistice, and around another 14 were assembled after the end of hostilities. A small number of postwar aircraft were built with four seats under the designation M.9bis and were used in Switzerland for carrying passengers and mail.

Operators

Argentine Navy
Argentine Naval Aviation

Brazilian Naval Aviation

Corpo Aeronautico Militare

Polish Navy (Naval Aviation Base in Puck)

Specifications

See also

References

Notes

Bibliography
 Angelucci, Enzo. The Rand McNally Encyclopedia of Military Aircraft, 1914-1980. San Diego, California: The Military Press, 1983. .
Nelcarz, Bartolomiej and Robert Peczkowski. White Eagles: The Aircraft, Men and Operations of the Polish Air Force 1918–1939. Ottringham, UK: Hikoki Publications, 2001. 
 Grey, C.G. Jane's All the World's Aircraft 1919. London: Sampson Low Marston, 1969 (reprint). .
 Taylor, Michael J. H. Jane's Encyclopedia of Aviation. London: Studio Editions, 1989. .

1910s Italian bomber aircraft
Flying boats
M.09
Biplanes
Single-engined pusher aircraft
Aircraft first flown in 1918